Edward Reynolds was  an English Anglican priest in the 17th century.

The son of Bishop Edward Reynolds, he was  educated at Magdalen College, Oxford.  He became the Rector of St Peter's Church, Northampton.  He was Archdeacon of Norfolk from 1661 until his death on 28 June 1698.

Notes

17th-century English Anglican priests
Archdeacons of Norfolk
Alumni of Magdalen College, Oxford
1698 deaths